Year 185 (CLXXXV) was a common year starting on Friday (link will display the full calendar) of the Julian calendar. At the time, it was known as the Year of the Consulship of Lascivius and Atilius (or, less frequently, year 938 Ab urbe condita). The denomination 185 for this year has been used since the early medieval period, when the Anno Domini calendar era became the prevalent method in Europe for naming years.

Events 
 By place 

 Roman Empire 
 Nobles of Britain demand that Emperor Commodus rescind all power given to Tigidius Perennis, who is eventually executed.  
 Publius Helvius Pertinax is made governor of Britain and quells a mutiny of the British Roman legions who wanted him to become emperor. The disgruntled usurpers go on to attempt to assassinate the governor. 
 Tigidius Perennis, his family and many others are executed for conspiring against Commodus.
 Commodus drains Rome's treasury to put on gladiatorial spectacles and confiscates property to support his pleasures. He participates as a gladiator and boasts of victory in 1,000 matches in the Circus Maximus.

 China 
 Zhi Yao, a Kushan Buddhist monk of Yuezhi ethnicity, translates Buddhist texts into the Chinese language during the Han Dynasty.
 February – The rebels of the Yellow Turban are defeated by the imperial army, but only two months later, the rebellion breaks out again. It spreads to the Taihang Mountains on the western border of Hebei Province.

 By topic 

 Art and Science 
 Cleomedes discovers the refraction of light by the Earth's atmosphere.
 A supernova now known as SN 185 is noted by Chinese astronomers in the Astrological Annals of the Houhanshu, making it the earliest recorded supernova.

 Religion 
 Irenaeus writes that there are only four Gospels (approximate date).

Births 
 Liu Ji (or Jingyu), Chinese official and minister (d. 233)
 Origen, Christian scholar and theologian (approximate date)
 Wang Xiang, Chinese minister of the Cao Wei state (d. 269)

Deaths 
 April 21 – Apollonius the Apologist, Christian apologist
 Pharasmanes III (or P'arsman), Georgian king of Iberia
 Tigidius Perennis, Roman praetorian prefect (executed)

References